
Gmina Chodów is a rural gmina (administrative district) in Koło County, Greater Poland Voivodeship, in west-central Poland.

Villages
Gmina Chodów contains the villages and settlements of Aleksandrów, Bowyczyny, Budy-Gole, Chodów, Chrzanowo, Czerwonka, Długie, Domaników, Dziegielewo, Dzierzbice, Elizanów, Gąsiory, Ignacewo, Jagiełłów, Kaleń Duża, Kaleń Mała, Kocewia Duża, Koserz, Niwki, Nowe Niwki, Nowy Koserz, Nowy Rdutów, Pniewo, Rdutów, Stanisławów, Studzień, Szołajdy, Turzynów, Wewierz, Wojciechowo and Zieleniec.

Neighbouring gminas
Gmina Chodów is bordered by the gminas of Dąbrowice, Daszyna, Grabów, Kłodawa, Krośniewice and Przedecz.

References
Polish official population figures 2006

Chodow
Koło County